Amblyptilia shirozui is a moth of the family Pterophoridae. It was described by Yano in 1965 and is found in Taiwan.

References

Moths described in 1965
Amblyptilia
Moths of Taiwan